Nurmekund (Low German: Nurmegunde) was a small independent country (ancient Estonian county) on the north coast of Lake Võrtsjärv in Central Estonia, bordered by Sakala, Alempois, Järvamaa, Mõhu, and Ugandi. Nurmekund had an area of approximately 600 hides.

See also 
 History of Estonia
 Imavere
 Kabala
 Kolga-Jaani
 Kõo
 Livonian Crusade
 Monastic state of the Teutonic Knights
 Pilistvere
 Põltsamaa
 Rulers of Estonia
 Võhma

References

External links 
 Kuidas elasid inimesed vanasti, möödunud sajandil ja praegu (Estonian)
 9. - 13. saj.pärinevad Eesti aardeleiud (Estonian)
 Eesti haldusjaotus ja võõrvõimude vaheldumine läbi aegade (Estonian)
 Põltsamaa linnus (Estonian)

Ancient counties of Estonia